Gonionota anelicta is a moth in the family Depressariidae. It was described by Edward Meyrick in 1926. It is found in Bolivia.

The wingspan is about 16 mm. The forewings are brown, with a slight rosy tinge and a white dot on the costa at two-fifths, edged anteriorly by dark grey suffusion and followed by a short indistinct somewhat oblique streak of grey suffusion, the recurved portion of the costa also dark grey. There is a small white spot on the costa at two-thirds, the costal edge preceding this shortly white to meet the recurved portion. The first discal stigma is indistinctly grey, the second white. The hindwings are dark grey.

References

Moths described in 1926
Gonionota